Lagi Letoa is a former Samoan international lawn bowler.

Bowls career
Letoa has represented Samoa at two Commonwealth Games; in the pairs at the 1994 Commonwealth Games and in the singles at the 1998 Commonwealth Games.

She won a pairs bronze medal (with Akenese Westerlund) at the 1995 Asia Pacific Bowls Championships in Dunedin.

References

Living people
Year of birth missing (living people)
Bowls players at the 1994 Commonwealth Games
Bowls players at the 1998 Commonwealth Games
Samoan bowls players